Appler-Englar House is a historic home located at New Windsor, Carroll County, Maryland.  It is a two-story, five-by-two-bay brick dwelling constructed about 1790 in the Georgian style.

It was listed on the National Register of Historic Places in 2001.

References

External links
, including photo in 2006, at Maryland Historical Trust

Houses on the National Register of Historic Places in Maryland
Houses in Carroll County, Maryland
Houses completed in 1790
Georgian architecture in Maryland
New Windsor, Maryland
National Register of Historic Places in Carroll County, Maryland